Saadi Street is a street in central part of Shiraz, Iran.

Streets in Shiraz